Flik 10 was an aviation company of the Austro-Hungarian Airforce during the First World War.

History 

In January 1918, Jindra Struckel was appointed commander of Flik 11, although he soon got a more active command in Fliegergruppe G when he was posted to a bombing unit on the Italian front. He was injured during a night flight shortly after his arrival, and command of the squadron had to be passed on to Jindra's old pilot. In September 1915, he entered the LFT as an observer. In October, he was assigned to Flik 10 in Russia, shifting to Flik 20 in February 1916.

Flying aces 
Flik 10 had two flying aces during its existence.

References 

Austro-Hungarian Air Force